"Take Me in Your Arms (Rock Me a Little While)" is a song written by the premier Motown songwriting/production team of the 1960s Holland–Dozier–Holland. The first hit recording was sung by Kim Weston in 1965. It was most popular in 1975 when it was recorded by the Doobie Brothers.

Early versions
Eddie Holland of Holland-Dozier-Holland made the original recording of "Take Me in Your Arms" in 1964. This version was not released commercially until 2005. Holland-Dozier-Holland had Kim Weston record the song in 1965 and her version was released that September. Mike Terry is the baritone sax player. It peaked at number 4 on the R&B chart in Billboard and at number 50 on the Hot 100. In 1967, the Isley Brothers recorded the song. Their version released in March 1968 and reached number 121 in the U.S. and 22 on the R&B chart.

The American jazz-rock band Blood, Sweat & Tears released a version of the song on the album BST4 in June 1971.

Jermaine Jackson released "Take Me in Your Arms" for his first solo album, Jermaine, released in 1972. The track, produced by Hal Davis, was the B-side for Jackson's record "Daddy's Home".

The Doobie Brothers
The Doobie Brothers recorded "Take Me in Your Arms" for their 1975 Stampede album. Tom Johnston, who was then the Doobies' frontman, later recalled, "I had been a fan of that song since it came out somewhere in the '60s. I just loved that song. So somewhere around '72 I started lobbying to get the band to do a cover of that. And I didn't get anywhere until '75. Then finally in 1975 we actually did it."

Doobies member Jeff Baxter said of their recording, "That song was like a dream come true for us. Every musician I've ever known has at some point wanted to achieve Motown's technically slick soul sound - it's so dynamic. We sat down to try to duplicate it, and to see if our version could emerge as a successful single." According to Doobies member Patrick Simmons, "At first the band sounded like the Grateful Dead doing the Four Tops, but gradually it came together quite accurately." Motown veteran Paul Riser was enlisted to arrange the track.

Released as the lead single of Stampede on April 23, 1975, "Take Me in Your Arms" reached a United States Hot 100 peak of number 11 that June. "Take Me in Your Arms" gave the Doobie Brothers their only chart hit in France, where it reached number 37. The track also charted in the UK at number 29, matching the chart peak of the Doobie Brothers' only other original release Top 30 hit "Listen to the Music" (The Doobie Brothers reached number 7 in the UK in 1993 with a remixed version of their 1973 single "Long Train Runnin'") and in Australia at number 34.

Other notable versions
"Take Me in Your Arms" was also released in 1975 by the Canadian singer Charity Brown whose version, produced by Harry Hinde, was arranged by the Motown veteran Tom Baird. The Charity Brown rendering reached number 5 in Canada in May 1975.  
The song was also recorded by Blood Sweat & Tears on BS&T 4. Brown's single was given a May 1975 release in the UK where it failed to chart. The track appeared on Brown's 1975 album Charity Brown.

Australian pop group The Chantoozies released their version as a single in 2019, which was the last song to feature founding member Tottie Goldsmith.

Chart performance

Weekly charts
Kim Weston

Isley Brothers

Charity Brown

Year-end charts

Doobie Brothers

References

External links
 
 

1964 songs
1965 singles
1967 singles
1975 singles
The Doobie Brothers songs
The Isley Brothers songs
Songs written by Holland–Dozier–Holland
Song recordings produced by Ted Templeman
Motown singles
Gordy Records singles
Warner Records singles
Song recordings produced by Hal Davis